Saint-Jean-le-Vieux is the name of several communes in France:

 Saint-Jean-le-Vieux, Ain
 Saint-Jean-le-Vieux, Isère
 Saint-Jean-le-Vieux, Pyrénées-Atlantiques